The following are the football (soccer) events of the year 1905 throughout the world.

Events
 Leeds City F.C. admitted to the English Football League.
 On February 19, Alf Common becomes the first player to be transferred for a fee of £1,000 (a 2011 equivalent of roughly £95,000), in a transfer from Sunderland A.F.C. to Middlesbrough F.C.

Clubs formed in 1905
Charlton Athletic Football Club
Crystal Palace Football Club
Chelsea Football Club
Club Atletico Boca Juniors
Galatasaray SK - Turkey
Sport Club do Recife - Brazil
ADO Den Haag - Netherlands
A.C. Perugia Calcio - Italy
1. FSV Mainz 05 - Germany

Winners club national championship
 Germany: Union 92 Berlin
 Hungary: Ferencvárosi TC
 Italy: Juventus
 Scotland: 
Scottish Division One – Celtic
Scottish Division Two – Clyde
Scottish Cup – Third Lanark

International tournaments
1905 British Home Championship (February 25 – April 8, 1905)

Births
 January 18 – Enrique Ballesteros, Uruguayan footballer
 May 11 – Pedro Petrone, Uruguayan footballer
 September 25 – Aurelio González (Paraguayan footballer)
 September 26 – Karl Rappan, Austrian footballer and manager (died 1996)
 October 16 – Ernst Kuzorra, German international footballer (die 1990)
 December 28 – Fulvio Bernardini, Italian international footballer and trainer (died 1977)

Deaths
September 6 - Morris Bates, 39, former Nottingham Forest player and founding member of Woolwich Arsenal FC, tuberculosis.

References 

 
Association football by year